The 1982 Professional Players Tournament was a professional ranking snooker tournament that took place in two venues in the Birmingham area. One was at the La Reserve in Sutton Coldfield and the other was the International Snooker Club in Aston. It was the first tournament in a series which is now known as the World Open. The event was untelevised and unsponsored.

Ray Reardon defeated Jimmy White 10–5 in the final, to win the first prize of £5,000 and his first ranking tournament win since the 1978 World Championship. Reardon became the oldest winner of a ranking event at the age of 50 years and 14 days. He remains the oldest winner of a ranking event.

Six places in the 1983 Masters were allocated to the players, not already in the field, who advanced furthest in the event. They were semi-finalist John Virgo, quarter-finalists Joe Johnson, Dean Reynolds and Bill Werbeniuk, and Mark Wildman and Tony Meo who lost in the last 16.

Main draw

Final

Century breaks

 135, 109  Willie Thorne
 132  Ray Reardon
 126  John Spencer
 119  Terry Griffiths
 113  Ian Black
 112  Dean Reynolds
 101  Bill Werbeniuk

References 

1982
Professional Players Tournament
Professional Players Tournament
Professional Players Tournament